The 2001 NCAA Division I men's soccer tournament was the 42nd organized men's college soccer tournament by the National Collegiate Athletic Association, to determine the top college soccer team in the United States. The North Carolina won their first national title by defeating the Indiana in the championship game, 2–0. This was the first tournament to feature an expanded 48-team field although it remained that only the top eight teams were seeded. The final match was played on December 16, 2001 in Columbus, Ohio at Columbus Crew Stadium, as were the two semi-final matches on December 14. All first, second, third and forth round games were played at the home field of the higher seeded team.

Seeded Teams

Bracket

Regional 1

Regional 2

Regional 3

Regional 4

Final Four – Columbus Crew Stadium, Columbus, Ohio

References

NCAA Division I Mens Soccer
NCAA Division I Men's Soccer Tournament seasons
NCAA Division I men's soccer tournament
NCAA Division I men's soccer tournament